Midnight Street is a British horror fiction magazine founded and published by Trevor Denyer. It is a resurrection of a previous publication titled Roadworks, published under the current title since 2004.

See also
 Science fiction magazine
 Fantasy fiction magazine
 Horror fiction magazine

References

External links
Midnight Street website

2004 establishments in the United Kingdom
Science fiction magazines published in the United Kingdom
Horror fiction magazines
Magazines established in 2004